Jelovac is a village in Despotovac municipality, in the Pomoravlje District of Serbia.

Populated places in Pomoravlje District